The Ford Cupé V-8, also known simply as the Ford V-8, is a series of various custom-built race cars, designed, developed and built by various people between 1938 and 1960. Such cars were raced by the drivers of the likes of Juan Manuel Fangio, Pablo Birger, Oscar Alfredo Gálvez, Francisco de Ridder, and Carlo Tomasi, to name a few. They were commonly powered by Ford flathead V-8s. They were based on a few different classic Ford models, including the De Luxe, the 1932 Ford, the Model 48, and the 1937 Ford.

References

Ford vehicles
Grand tourers
Grand tourer racing cars
1930s cars
1940s cars
Cars of the United States
Cars of Argentina
Cars introduced in 1938
Pre-war vehicles